Crathorne may refer to:

 Crathorne, North Yorkshire, England
 Baron Crathorne